Demetrida quadricollis is a species of ground beetle in Lebiinae subfamily. It was described by Sloane in 1917 and is endemic to Australia.

References

Beetles described in 1917
Beetles of Australia
quadricollis